Flaxton is a small rural community in between the towns of Rangiora and Kaiapoi in the Waimakariri District, New Zealand.

History
Flaxton is in the middle of what was once the Rangiora swamp. Plans for the drainage of this swamp (4000 acres) were prepared, and the first two miles of main drain were cut in about 1860. Two years later another two and a half miles were added, and also several branch drains. These drains have had the effect of drying the land, and lowering the level of the ground in places by as much as eight feet.

Climate
The average temperature in summer is 16.2, and in winter is 6.4.

References

Waimakariri District
Populated places in Canterbury, New Zealand